"Hasht-Bihisht" (lit. "The Eight Paradises") is a famous poem written by Amir Khusrow around 1302 AD.  The poem is based on the Haft Paykar by Nizami, written around 1197 AD, which in turn takes its outline from the earlier epic Shahnameh written by Firdausi around 1010 AD. Like Nizami's Haft Paykar, Khusrow's Hasht Bihisht uses a legend about Bahram V Gur as its frame story and, in the style of One Thousand and One Nights, introduces folktales told by seven princesses.  Most famously, Khusrow appears to be the first writer to have added The Three Princes of Serendip as characters and the story of the alleged camel theft and recovery.

The eight "paradises" in the poem link closely with the Islamic conception of Heaven with its eight gates and eight spaces, each one decorated with a special precious stone or material. Seven of the eight paradises are pavilions constructed for Bahram's "therapy" of storytelling. There is also a link to the architectural and garden plan of eight paradises.

The narrative
The narrative commences with the story of Bahram and Dilaram.

Later, Bahram has seven differently-coloured domed pavilions built for him within his palace grounds, in which wait seven princesses from various parts of the world. Bahram Gur visits each on a different day of the week and each of them tells him a story:

 Saturday – the Black Pavilion – the Indian Princess (The Tale of the Three Princes of Serendip)
 Sunday – the Yellow Pavilion – the Princess of Nimruz
 Monday – the Green Pavilion – the Slav Princess
 Tuesday – the Red Pavilion – the Tatar Princess
 Wednesday – the Violet Pavilion – the Princess of Rum
 Thursday – the Brown Pavilion – the Arabian Princess
 Friday – the White Pavilion – the Princess of Khwarezm

Manuscripts
The Hasht-Bihisht, and indeed the whole of the Khamsah, was a popular work in the centuries after Khusrow's death, not only in India, but in Iran and the Ottoman Empire, and as such was illustrated nearly as frequently as Nizami's Khamsah from the early fifteenth century on.

Translations
 The Hasht-Bihisht has never been translated entirely into any language except Russian and Italian. Verse translations of two stories (Tuesday and Friday) by Sunil Sharma have been published. 
 Lal and Prasada provide a partial direct-to-English translation and commentary of Saturday's tale which introduces The Three Princes of Serendip.

Walters Art Museum Manuscript W.623
An illustrated and illuminated manuscript of the poem was part of a Khamsah from 1609 CE produced in Safavid Iran. All texts are written in black nastaʿlīq script with chapter headings in red.

Walters Art Museum Manuscript W.624
The poem was illustrated in a manuscript probably produced in Lahore in the late sixteenth CE which is associated with the patronage of Akbar (r. 1556-1605 CE).

The manuscript was written in nasta'liq script by one of the greatest calligraphers of the Mughal atelier, Muhammad Husayn al-Kashmiri, honoured with the epithet Zarrin Qalam (golden pen).  The manuscript has the names of a number of  painters: Lal, Manuhar, Sanwalah, Farrukh, Aliquli, Dharamdas, Narsing, Jagannath, Miskina, Mukund, and Surdas Gujarati. The illuminators are Husayn Naqqash, Mansur Naqqash, Khvajah Jan Shirazi, and Lutf Allah Muzahhib

References

Persian poetry
Indian folklore
Literary illuminated manuscripts
Mughal art
Islamic illuminated manuscripts
Indian literature
Illuminated manuscripts of the Walters Art Museum, Baltimore
Indian manuscripts
Indian fairy tales